Being with You may refer to:
 Being with You (album), a 1981 album by Smokey Robinson
 "Being with You" (song), a single from the album